Kings of Colosseum is a professional wrestling supercard event produced by Major League Wrestling (MLW). The first event was held in 2019 as a special live episode of MLW's weekly series, Fusion.

Dates and venues

External links
Major League Wrestling official website

Kings of Colosseum
Recurring events established in 2019